Hovea longipes is a species of flowering plant in the family Fabaceae and is endemic to north-eastern Australia. It is a shrub or tree with narrowly elliptic to lance-shaped leaves, and deep indigo-blue and white, pea-like flowers.

Description

Taxonomy and naming
Hovea longipes was first formally described in 1837 by George Bentham in Stephan Endlicher's Enumeratio plantarum quas in Novae Hollandiae ora austro-occidentali ad fluvium Cygnorum et in sinu Regis Georgii collegit Carolus Liber Baro de Hügel.

Distribution and habitat
This species of pea grows in rainforest, scrub and woodland on sandy soils from near the Iron Range National Park in north Queensland to Lake Glenbawn in north-eastern New South Wales.

References

longipes
Flora of Queensland
Flora of New South Wales
Fabales of Australia
Plants described in 1837
Taxa named by George Bentham